Krummhörn is a municipality in the district of Aurich, in Lower Saxony, Germany. It is situated near the Ems estuary, approximately 15 km southwest of Norden, and 10 km northwest of Emden.

The community (Gemeinde) of Krummhörn comprises 19 villages, and their official population as of 31 December 2008 is as follows:

Notable people

Eggerik Beninga (1490–1562), a chronicler of the Frisians, was born in Grimersum.
David Folkerts-Landau (born 1949), German economist

References

 
Towns and villages in East Frisia
Aurich (district)